Special Brew is a compilation album by British 2 Tone and ska band, Bad Manners. It was released on 11 April 2000.

Track listing
 "Special Brew"
 "Lip Up Fatty"
 "Skaville UK"
 "Sally Brown"
 "Buffalo Ska"
 "Since You've Gone Away"
 "Hey Little Girl"
 "How Big Do You Love Me"
 "Return of the Ugly"
 "Memory Train"
 "Mafia"
 "Rocksteady Breakfast"
 "Lorraine" (live)
 "Samson and Delilah" (live)
 "Inner London Violence" (live)
 "Can Can" (live)

2000 compilation albums
Bad Manners albums